Mike Gayle (born October 1970) is an English journalist and novelist.

Biography 
Gayle was born in Quinton, Birmingham, to parents from Jamaica, and is the younger brother of broadcaster Phil Gayle. He attended Lordswood Boys' School where he was Head Boy. He studied Sociology and Journalism at university.

Gayle edited a music fanzine and joined a Birmingham listings magazine before moving to London and beginning a postgraduate diploma in journalism. Before having his first novel published, he was a features editor and later an agony aunt for Just Seventeen and Bliss. As a freelance journalist he has written for the Sunday Times, The Guardian, The Times, the Daily Express, FHM, More!, The Scotsman and Top of the Pops.

Gayle is a chick-lit author, although he has expressed a dislike for the term. Alongside Tony Parsons and Tim Lott, he has also been associated with a "new wave of fictions about inadequate young British masculinities".

Gayle is friends with Danny Wallace, who has dubbed Mike his Minister of Home Affairs in the Kingdom of Lovely. He lives in Harborne with his daughters and his wife Claire.

Novels
My Legendary Girlfriend. London: Flame, 1998. 
Mr. Commitment. London: Flame, 1999. 
Turning Thirty. London: Flame, 2000. 
Dinner for Two. London: Flame, 2002. 
His 'n' Hers, 2004. 
Brand New Friend, 2005. 
Wish You Were Here, 2007. 
The Life & Soul of the Party, 2008. 
The To Do List, 2009. 
The Importance of Being a Bachelor, 2010. 
The Stag and Hen Weekend, 2012. 
Turning Forty, 2013. 
Seeing Other People, 2014.  
The Hope Family Calendar, 2016. 
The Man I Think I Know, 2018. 
Half a world away, 2019. 
All The Lonely People, 2020.

References

External links
Official website
MySpace page
Mike Gayle interview

1970 births
Living people
Writers from Birmingham, West Midlands
Black British writers
British advice columnists
British male journalists
21st-century British novelists
English people of Jamaican descent
British male novelists
21st-century English male writers
People educated at Lordswood Boys' School